The spotted bamboowren (Psilorhamphus guttatus) is a species of suboscine passerine bird in the tapaculo family Rhinocryptidae. It is the only species placed in the genus Psilorhamphus. It is found in southeastern Brazil, far northeastern Argentina, and possibly Paraguay.

Taxonomy
The spotted bamboowren is the only member of its genus and has no subspecies. It has at various times been placed in families Formicariidae (the antthrushes), Sylviidae ("typical" warblers), Thamnophilidae (antbirds), Troglodytidae (wrens), and Polioptilidae (gnatcatchers). Studies of its morphology and later of its genetics have firmly placed it in the tapaculo family.

The spotted bamboowren is genetically most closely related to the rusty-belted tapaculo (Liosceles thoracicus).

Description
The adult male's head and upper back are gray, and the lower back brownish. The throat and upper breast are whitish to buff, merging to buff on the lower breast and belly. The back, wings, and belly are sprinkled with small white, brown, or black spots. The adult female is similar, but the top of the head and upper back are brown, and the upper breast buffy.

Distribution and habitat

The spotted bamboowren is endemic to the Atlantic Forest biome of Brazil and Argentina. Its range extends from southeastern Minas Gerais and western Espírito Santo through Rio Grande do Sul in Brazil into Argentina's northern Misiones Province. It might also occur in southeastern Paraguay, though the South American Classification Committee of the American Ornithological Society (AOS) has not confirmed that.

As its name implies, the spotted bamboowren is usually found in bamboo, typically at the edge of dense forest, but also in tangles of vines and other dense foliage. In the northern part of its range it is found from  elevation and in the south from  up.

Behavior

Feeding

It occasionally forages on the ground. Its principle prey is insects and insect larvae.

Breeding

The spotted bamboowren's breeding phenology has not been studied.

Vocalization

The spotted bamboowren's song is described as "wood-wood-wood" repeated for up to 20 seconds with changing pitch and volume .

Status

The IUCN has assessed the spotted bamboowren as least concern. Its range is restricted to the southern Atlantic Forest, a biome that has undergone extensive clearing for agriculture and human settlement. Its population is unknown but is believed to be decreasing. It does, however, inhabit a few protected areas.

References

spotted bamboowren
Birds of the Atlantic Forest
spotted bamboowren
Taxonomy articles created by Polbot